Talimeren Ao (28 January 1918 – 13 September 1998) was an Indian footballer and physician from Nagaland. He is best known as the captain of the India national football team in their first ever match after independence. One of the most famous Nagas, he was a figurehead of India's football history, and his name is resonant in the collective memory of the people. He played domestic club football for Mohun Bagan.

Early life 
On 28 January 1918, Ao was born to Reverend Subongwati Ningdangri Ao and Maongsangla Changkilari in Changki village in the Naga Hills. He was their fourth child among 12.

Ao studied at Impur Christian School and was captain of the school team. In 1937, he was nominated as best footballer of All Assam Inter School Football Championship after winning the tournament with the team. He later joined Jorhat Christian Mission School and also captained it's football ream.

Club career

Mohun Bagan
In 1943, Ao joined then Calcutta Football League club Mohun Bagan AC, who were then in the Calcutta Football League. He captained the Maroon and Green in 1948 and 1949, taking over from Sarat Das. Sarat Das was Ao's senior in Cotton College, and both of them had played for the Maharana Club of Guwahati, then most successful club of Assam. Ao was a striker in the Maharana Club but on joining Mohun Bagan he was positioned in the defense. In Mohun Bagan, Ao was Centre-Half and along with his two Backs, they were popularly known as "the Great Wall of China". He was given the captain's armband in 1948 to captain the Indian Football Team in London. In 1950 Ao captained Bagan in the Durand Cup but lost to Hyderabad Police in the final 1–0. Ao told his son that in this Durand Cup (1950) the Mohun Bagan goalkeeper was injured and that he took over in his place. Ao's footballing talents were well-known and as such, caught the attention of various clubs from overseas, among which included the famed English club Arsenal F.C. Ao famously rejected a one year contract from the club, choosing to continue with his studies; a decision which he never regretted in his later years.

International career

In 1948, a year after India won its independence, Ao became captain of the India national football team. He was part of the national team that toured to Europe in 1948 and went on to defeat the Pinner F.C. 9–1 on 24 July, Hayes F.C. 4–1 on 26 July, and Alexandra Park FC 8–2 on 28 July. He led the team at the 1948 Summer Olympics in London, in their first official game and was flag-bearer of the Indian contingent. India was then managed by Balaidas Chatterjee. Their first match was against Burma but the game was a walkover. In India's second match against France, he played alongside Sailen Manna and Sheoo Mewalal, but the team lost 2–1, with the Indian goal coming from Sarangapani Raman. Under his captaincy, bare feet Indian players' bravery earned admiration of Princess Margaret of England. Ao played five more matches for India before retiring. He also went on to play few friendly matches in their Nederlands tour, where they went down to Sparta Rotterdam, but managed to win against Ajax Amsterdam.

He played for Syed Abdul Rahim managed India until 1951, but missed a golden opportunity to play in the biggest tournament on earth, as India had not gone to the 1950 FIFA World Cup in Brazil.

Post-football career
Ao studied at Assam Medical College in Dibrugarh, Assam. He earned MBBS degree from there, and in 1963, returned to Nagaland where he was given the post of Assistant Civil Surgeon. He later became Civil Surgeon. Ao went on to be appointed as Director of Health Services of the Government of Nagaland, from which he retired in 1978.

Death
Early in 1998, Ao contracted seasonal influenza. Being already fragile of health and a diabetic, it led to further complications and deterioration. He was transported from Dimapur to Kohima, hospitalized and finally died in the Naga Civil Hospital, where he first served as Civil Surgeon in the early 1960s. He died on 13 September 1998. He wished to be and was buried in the Naga Cemetery, Khermahal, Dimapur. He had two sons, two daughters and eight grandchildren. His wife Deikim Doungel, a Staff Nurse, also passed away in June 2018.

Legacy
In 2002, Mohun Bagan Athletic Club honoured him by creating the Mohun Bagan Ratna Award and giving him a life membership. In Assam, an outdoor stadium at Kaliabor and an indoor stadium at Cotton College have been named after him.

In 2009, Union Minister for Mines, Bijoy Krishna Handique, inaugurated the first Dr. Talimeren Ao Football Trophy at the DDSC Stadium in Dimapur, Nagaland, to encourage and challenge the North-East Youth to excel in both sports and academics. In 2012, Government of Nagaland instituted Dr. T. Ao Awards in memory of him, and Naga archer Chekrovolü Swüro became the first one to receive it. In January 2018, a year-long celebration of the 100th birth anniversary of Ao was inaugurated at the Raj Bhavan in Kohima by the Nagaland Governor Padmanabha Acharya. In his memory, "T. Ao Inter District Football Tournament" was unveiled in Nagaland, by the Nagaland Football Association (NFA). In 2018, laying of foundation ston of both the Dr. T. Ao Sports Academy and Dr. T. Ao Stadium began.

In 2018, India Post issued a ₹5 commemorative postage stamp of Ao, the second Indian honoured with a postage stamp after Gostha Pal in 1998.

Honours

Mohun Bagan
IFA Shield: 1952
Calcutta Football League: 1943, 1944, 1951
Trades Cup: 1944, 1945, 1949
Coochbehar Cup: 1944, 1948, 1949

Bengal
 Santosh Trophy: 1945–46

Individual
University of Calcutta Athletic Meet individual championship trophy: 1946–47
Mohun Bagan Ratna Award: 2002

See also

Naga people
History of the India national football team
List of India national football team captains
India national football team at the Olympics
History of Indian football

References

Bibliography

Further reading

External links
 

1918 births
1998 deaths
University of Calcutta alumni
People from Mokokchung district
People from Kohima
Indian footballers
India international footballers
Footballers from Nagaland
Mohun Bagan AC players
Association football defenders
Olympic footballers of India
Footballers at the 1948 Summer Olympics
Calcutta Football League players